This is a list of fitness wear clothing brands with articles on Wikipedia. 
  

 Alanic
 Allbirds
 Akaso
 2XU
  361 Degrees
  4F (company)
  Acerbis
  A.F.C.A
  Adidas
  Admiral
  Air Jordan
  Airness
  Alanic
  AND1
  ANTA
  Ashworth
  ASICS
  Athleta
  Athletic DNA
  Atletica
  Audimas
  Avia
  BIKE Athletic Company
  BLK
  Brine
  British Cricket Balls
  British Knights
  Brooks
  Bukta
  Burley-Sekem
  Callaway
  Canterbury
  Capelli Sport
  Carbrini
  Castore (brand)
  CCM
  Champion
  Champs
  Classic Sportswear
  Columbia
  Converse
  Craft of Scandinavia 
  De Marchi
  Deuter Sport
  Diadora
  Donnay
  Dryworld
  Duarig
  Dunlop
  Dynamic
  Echt
  Ellesse
  Ell & Voo
  ERKE
  Erima
  Erreà
  Everlast
  Fabletics
  Fairtex Gym
  FBT
  Fila
  Finta
  Forward
  FSS
  Gymshark
  Galvin Green
  Geox
  Gilbert
  Givova
  Gola
  Golty
  Grand
  Gul
  Gunn & Moore
  Head
  Hi-Tec
  Hummel
  Hunkemöller HKMX
 ISC
 Ivivva athletica
 Jako
 Joma
 K-Swiss
 K2 Sports
 Kappa
  Karhu
  Kelme
  Kempa
  Keuka
  Kickers
 Kukri
 Lacoste
 Le Coq Sportif
 Le Tigre
 Let's Bands
 League
 Legea
 Li-Ning
 Linebreak
  Lonsdale
  Looptworks
  Lorna Jane
  Lotto
  Loudmouth Golf
  Luanvi
  Lululemon Athletica
  LUTA
  Macron
  Myprotein
  Majestic Athletic
  Marathon
  Maverik Lacrosse
  Merooj
  Meyba
  Mikasa
  Mitchell & Ness
  Mitre
  Mizuno
  Molten
  Moncler
  Mondetta
  Munich
  Musto
  Nanque
  New Balance
  New Era
  Nike
  Nivia
  No Fear
  Nomis
  Olympikus
  Onda
  One Way
  O'Neill
  O'Neills
  Outdoor Voices
  Patrick
  Peak
  Pearl Izumi
  Penalty
  Ping
  Pirma
  Pony
  Prince
  Prospecs
  Puma
  Quechua
  Quick
  Rapha
  Rhone
  Ryderwear
  Raymond Ltd
  Reebok
  Regatta (clothing) 
  Reusch
  Riddell
  Russell Athletic
  Ryderwear
  Rykä
  Robey
  Romai Sports
  Saeta
  Salomon
  Santini SMS
  Select
  Sergio Tacchini
  Sherrin
  Shimano
  Signia
  SIX5SIX
  Skins
  Skis Rossignol
  Slazenger
  Soffe
  Sondico
  Spalding
  SPECS
  Speedo
  Sportika
  Starbury
  Starter
  Steeden
  Sting
  Sugino
  Superga
  Swix
  TaylorMade-Adidas
  The Game
  Titleist
  Tokaido
  Topper
  TYKA
  Tyr
  Uhlsport
  Umbro
  Under Armour
  Walon Sport
  Warrior
  Warriors
  Warrix Sports
  Webb Ellis
  Wilson
  XBlades
  Xero Shoes
  Xtep
  Yonex
  Zoke

References

Lists of companies by industry
Lists of brands
Clothing-related lists